Lukács Bőle (born 27 March 1990) is a Hungarian professional footballer as a left winger for Paksi FC.

Club career

Politehnica Iași
After playing all his career for Kaposvár, Bőle moved to Romanian club Politehnica Iași. On 26 June 2014 he signed a one-year contract with the Liga I club. On 7 April 2015 Lukács scored a very important goal against Dinamo București to help his team to a 1–0 victory.

Ferencváros
On 12 June 2017, Bőle was signed by Nemzeti Bajnokság I club, Ferencvárosi TC. The duration of the contract was not revealed by the club, although it turned out that Ferencváros signed Bőle for free since his contract expired with Politehnica Iași.

On 16 June 2020, he became champion with Ferencváros by beating Budapest Honvéd FC at the Hidegkuti Nándor Stadion on the 30th match day of the 2019–20 Nemzeti Bajnokság I season.

Career statistics

Club

Honours
Ferencváros
Nemzeti Bajnokság I: 2018–19

References

External links

Player profile at HLSZ

 

1990 births
Living people
People from Marcali
Hungarian footballers
Association football midfielders
Kaposvári Rákóczi FC players
FC Politehnica Iași (2010) players
Ferencvárosi TC footballers
Zalaegerszegi TE players
Budapest Honvéd FC players
Nemzeti Bajnokság I players
Liga I players
Hungarian expatriate footballers
Expatriate footballers in Romania
Hungarian expatriate sportspeople in Romania
Sportspeople from Somogy County